John George Graham Brock (15 December 1915 – 1976) was an English footballer who played as a Goalkeeper for Swindon Town.

Turned out for Bristol University before joining Forest Green Rovers in 1935 he was then soon trailing before eventually joining Swindon Town who paid 1 Guinea to cover his services 

He later returned to Forest Green Rovers shortly before World War II and later played for Gloucester City.

References

External links
 Swindon Town FC record

1915 births
1976 deaths
English footballers
Forest Green Rovers F.C. players
Swindon Town F.C. players
Gloucester City A.F.C. players
English Football League players
Association football goalkeepers